Ömer Uzun (born 23 February 2000) is a German-born Turkish professional footballer who plays as a forward for Şanlıurfaspor .

Professional career
On 6 July 2019, Uzun signed a professional contract with Kayserispor. Uzun made his professional debut with Kayserispor in a 4-1 Süper Lig loss to İstanbul Başakşehir on 22 December 2019.

References

External links
 
 
 

2000 births
Footballers from Dortmund
German people of Turkish descent
Living people
Turkish footballers
Turkey youth international footballers
German footballers
Association football forwards
VfL Bochum players
Kayserispor footballers
Ankara Keçiörengücü S.K. footballers
Nazilli Belediyespor footballers
Şanlıurfaspor footballers
Süper Lig players
TFF First League players
TFF Second League players